The International Flight Training School (IFTS) is an International school for military pilots, based in Italy, born from a collaboration project between the Italian Air Force and Leonardo S.p.A. supported by CAE.

History 
The International Flight Training School was announced on 18 July 2018 during the Farnborough International Air Show in UK. On this occurrence the CEO of Leonardo S.p.A., Alessandro Profumo, and the then Italian Air Force Chief of Staff, the General Enzo Vecciarelli, signed the collaboration agreement that gave birth to the IFTS.

The training offer provided by the IFTS located at the Lecce-Galatina Air base is addressed to pilots belonging both to the Italian Air Force and to international air forces as well.

The IFTS School offers an Integrated Training System that exploits the Aermacchi M-346 advanced jet trainer and its Ground Based Training System (GBTS), both developed by Leonardo S.p.A. in collaboration with CAE to train military pilots intended for front-line fighters.

The Italian Air Force brings to the IFTS its longstanding expertise, the “Train As You Fight” imprinting to the training programme, selects international instructor pilots and ensures a stringent pilot qualification process.

Structures 
The School is currently based at Lecce-Galatina Air Base (Puglia), which is also used by the ItAF's 61st Wing that also operate Aermacchi MB.339 basic-advanced jet trainers that will be replaced, starting during 2021, by the new Aermacchi M-345 single engine jet trainer.

Starting from 2022 the IFTS it will be relocated in Sardinia, on the Decimomannu Air Base.

The campus is now under completion: The school covers a total area of 130,000 sqm, Approximately 35,000 sqm are dedicated to buildings currently under construction.

Training programme 
The IFTS’ training programme is dedicated to advanced pilot training, the so-called Phase IV (Advanced/Lead-In Fighter Training or LIFT), preparing pilots for flying on next generation fighters.

The IFTS School offers customised training modules, tailored to the proficiency and output standard required each time by the air forces’ specific needs and syllabus and  that are made in such a way to minimize the time a student has to spend at the Operational Conversion Unit (OCU).

On October 26 2021, Italy and Japan reached an arrangement for the training of Japanese military pilots at the International Flight Training School (IFTS). After Qatar and Germany, Japan is the third country to choose IFTS to train its pilots.

The International Flight Training School recently awarded the first Phase IV (Advanced/Lead-In to Fighter Training) diploma to two pilots of the Luftwaffe, the German Air Force, further to the completion of their training.

Equipment and technologies 
The flight training is carried out with the 22 Aermacchi M-346 Master high-performance advanced training aircraft, built by Leonardo S.p.A. and put at the School's disposal (18 belonging to the Italian Air Force and  4 directly delivered by Leonardo to the IFTS, last one delivered at the end of October 2019).

The Aermacchi M-346 Master is equipped with an on-board simulation suite: through the Embedded Tactical Training System (ETTS), which has been developed by Leonardo, students can be exposed to realistic simulated tactical scenarios, with threats and targets, simulating on-board sensors (i.e. multimode fire control radar, targeting pod) and weapons. The Ground Based Training System (GBTS) includes state-of-the-art full mission simulators by CAE and other advanced training devices. Exploiting LVC technology by Leonardo, students on-board of real aircraft (Live) can interact with pilots in the simulators (Virtual) and Computer Generated Forces (Constructive) within the same training mission.

The Integrated Training System employed for phase IV training exploits the Training Management and Information System (TMIS), a management software developed by Leonardo's Aircraft Division, under the supervision of the Italian Air Force School Command. The software enables to schedule and plan the daily training activities in an automated way, with a careful monitoring and management of pilots and instructor pilots’ progress. Within the IFTS, this software has been used for the first time in 2019.

See also 
 Italian Air Force
 Leonardo S.p.A.

References 

Aeronautica Militare